Sturla Mentzoni (born 25 February 1977) is a retired Norwegian football midfielder.

He started his youth career in Innstrandens IL and was capped for Norway as a youth international. He made his Eliteserien debut for FK Bodø/Glimt in May 1996 against Kongsvinger. After three seasons he played for Sarpsborg FK before rejoining Innstranden, and finally getting another spell in the 1. divisjon for Skeid.

References

1977 births
Living people
Sportspeople from Bodø
Norwegian footballers
Norway youth international footballers
FK Bodø/Glimt players
Sarpsborg FK players
Skeid Fotball players
Eliteserien players
Norwegian First Division players
Association football midfielders